Jennifer Lee Brunner (born February 5, 1957) is an American attorney, politician and judge. She is currently an associate justice of the Ohio Supreme Court, a position to which she was elected after serving as a judge on Ohio's Tenth District Court of Appeals. On June 8, 2021, Brunner announced her candidacy for Chief Justice of the Ohio Supreme Court in the November 8, 2022, general election. Brunner is a member of the Democratic Party who served as the Ohio Secretary of State; Brunner was the first woman to serve in this capacity.  She took office after sixteen years of Republican control, which included two four-year terms by her predecessor J. Kenneth Blackwell, who oversaw the 2000 and 2004 United States elections. Brunner served only a single term as Secretary of State. When it came time for re-election in 2010, she instead made an unsuccessful bid for the U.S. Senate. Prior to being elected Secretary of State, Brunner worked in the Ohio Secretary of State's Office and served as a County Judge in Franklin County, Ohio. She also owned her own private practice; during her private practice career, she focused on election law and campaign finance law. She represented a broad range of candidates, businesses, political parties and committees before the Ohio Elections Commission on quasi-criminal matters.

As Secretary of State, Brunner was actively involved in evaluating and adjusting statewide election systems. Her efforts focused on correcting the procedural election difficulties that Ohio was known for.  She evaluated voting mechanisms and instituted policy changes.  She argued policy regarding same day voting, privacy of social security information, and foreclosure-related voter eligibility.

In 2008, she earned a Profile in Courage Award for her reform of the voting systems. During the 2008 United States elections, Brunner was involved in several court cases in the Ohio State Supreme Court and United States Supreme Court regarding voter registration, provisional ballots and absentee ballots.

On February 17, 2009, she announced that she would run for the 2010 United States Senate election in Ohio, coincident with the retirement of incumbent George Voinovich and the end of her term as Secretary of State. Lieutenant Governor Lee Fisher announced his candidacy on the same day and defeated her in the Democratic primary on May 4, 2010.

Brunner announced on February 18, 2014, that she was certified by the Franklin County Board of Elections as the Democratic candidate for the Ohio Tenth District Court of Appeals.  Brunner defeated incumbent Judge Amy O'Grady in the general election.

On August 17, 2019, Brunner announced she would be a candidate for the Ohio Supreme Court in 2020, in opposition to current Justice Judith L. French. She went on to win the general election on November 3, 2020.

Career 
Brunner was born in Springfield, Ohio, and spent her formative years in Columbus, Ohio. She earned a B.A. in sociology-gerontology, cum laude, from Miami University in 1978 and a J.D. from Capital University Law School with honors in 1982.  Subsequently, Brunner worked in the Ohio Secretary of State's Office as a deputy director and legislative counsel to the Ohio General Assembly during the administration of Sherrod Brown from 1983 to 1987. In four years of service under Brown, Brunner's responsibilities included working with state legislators on finance-reporting laws for campaign committees and laws for election procedures.

Private practice 
She then began a statewide law practice where she worked on election law and campaign finance from 1988 to 2000.  She briefly served as a member of the Franklin County Board of Elections, appointed by Republican Secretary of State, Bob Taft. In 1988, Brunner represented the Ohio Pesticide Applicators for Responsible Regulation, when the Ohio Environmental Protection Agency held hearings about testing Ohio water supplies for pesticides that were not against federal regulations.  Her clients, including lawn care chemical companies, agreed that testing standards should be higher, but that such standards should not be mandated.  She expressed an interest in public service when a seat on the Columbus City Council became available following the April 29, 1988 death of John R. Maloney.  The list of candidates who applied included at least 20 applicants.

Brunner has litigated various ballot propositions. In 1988, she represented a client who contested the validity of a ballot proposal to halt the sale of alcohol at the Cuyahoga Falls entertainment center.  She was treasurer of a citizens group that attacked the financial reports related to a Westerville, Ohio school district tax levy on the November 1988 ballot.  Later in 1989, she represented property owners in a rezoning referendum.  Brunner represented Ohioans Against Casino Gambling in its dispute over the wording of the 1990 ballot issue on "games of chances".

Brunner's private practice was not exclusively about ballot issues. She served as treasurer of Choice '90, a political action committee that ran television commercials about the abortion positions of 1990 Ohio's gubernatorial candidates (Anthony J. Celebrezze Jr. (D) and George Voinovich (R)) but that was funded primarily by the Ohio Democratic Party.  Brunner represented Ohio Democratic Party Chairman Eugene Branstool in battles with the Ohio Republican Robert Bennett and Canton, Ohio industrialist William R. Timken over the state redistricting following the 1990 Census.  Brunner successfully brought a claim by Ohio House of Representatives Seventh District representative Rocco J. Colonna against Brook Park Mayor Thomas Coyne in 1991 for circulating campaign literature containing false statements.

Brunner was also involved in a drawn out case involving the rights of Hamilton County bars to serve alcohol in glass containers.  The bars she represented were effectively put out of business by neighborhood residents' passage of an ordinance.  Brunner challenged petition signatures on a similar matter in Franklin County.  However, the case in Franklin County was dismissed. The Hamilton County plaintiffs were granted a stay preventing the Ohio Liquor Control Commission from receiving the certified May 7 results.  This stay allowed their case to be heard.  Meanwhile, Brunner won another related case in the United States Court of Appeals for the Sixth Circuit. The case overturned a state law allowing liquor licenses to be revoked by popular referendum.  This ruling bolstered the case of the other four bars she represented. In 1992, Franklin County Democratic Party chairwoman Fran Ryan approached Brunner about becoming a judge, but Brunner declined.

Brunner successfully defended Ohio House of Representatives member C.J. Prentiss when her position on the ballot was challenged in the May 1994 primary. In 1998, she successfully represented House Rep. Charleta Tavares when her petition signatures were challenged during her candidacy to replace J. Kenneth Blackwell as Ohio Secretary of State.

In 1994, she represented the Delaware County Amphitheater Action Committee, a group that attempted to block the state Liquor Department from issuing a beer permit.  When their case was dismissed, they appealed to the Ohio Supreme Court.  At the same time, she represented vendors whose liquor licenses were about to be cancelled following a vote where poll workers allegedly acted with bias.  Brunner got her clients a September 1994 ruling that the poll workers had, in fact, attempted to influence voters.  That same month, she was unable to get a pair of liquor option questions removed from the November 1994 ballot.

In 1994, Brunner also represented neighbors of an adult video store that was being razed to make way for a McDonald's store in an affluent neighborhood.  She obtained a 14-day restraining order to halt issuance of a zoning certificate and demolition and building permits.  The Bexley, OH neighborhood hosts the Ohio Governor's Mansion and mansions once owned by Hustler publisher Larry Flynt and The Limited chairman Les Wexner.  She got citizens to appear before the zoning appeals board to attempt to stop the construction. The Citizens were unsuccessful in convincing the Board of Zoning Appeals to change their earlier decisions.  After the citizens were unsuccessful with the zoning board, they pursued remedy in the Franklin County Common Pleas Court.  In addition to the court proceedings, the citizens sought the attention of the City Council in attempt to preserve the neighborhood by keeping the video store from being converted into a McDonald's.  On April 7, 1995, Brunner gained a verdict for her clients that in the interest of avoiding traffic congestion and pedestrian dangers, the McDonald's would not be allowed to build.  The developer attempted to appeal the decision by obtaining friend-of-the-court briefs from surrounding municipalities. The Franklin County Appeals Court overturned the lower court ruling making way for the construction of the McDonald's.  Brunner's clients appealed to the Ohio Supreme Court. However, the Supreme Court declined to hear the case.  A few other cases against the developers remained in some lower courts.  However, these were unsuccessful.  After the lower court zoning victory, in May 1995, she was hired to oppose a  project.

In 1995, Brunner again applied for a vacant seat on the Columbus City Council.  That year, Brunner represented the AFL-CIO in their battle against proposed rule changes related to new Ohio campaign finance laws.  Also, in 1995, she was hired to handle several elections law cases. She successfully represented Franklin County Democratic Party Chairman Dennis White in a 1996 case about whether his primary campaign mailings violated Ohio election laws. She also was involved in a residency challenge in 1996. She represented a Seneca County constituent of then State Representative (current State Senator) Karen Gillmor who felt the Franklin County home where Gillmor's family resides is her true residence.  The challenge failed.

Brunner was involved in a hanging chad controversy when in a 14,696-ballot November 4, 1997 election in Licking County an income tax issue which had failed by four votes subsequently passed by thirteen on a November 26 automatic recount.  Brunner was present for a court-ordered second January 6 recount to evaluate whether chads remained hanging by one, two, or three hinges or whether they were sufficiently indented to count.

Brunner represented the Save The Doves Committee, an animal rights group that attempted to ban the hunting of mourning doves in Ohio via a ballot initiative.  The group had previously attempted to petition the state to have the doves removed from the state game list. Ohio had formerly had a history of protecting mourning doves dating back to 1917, but hunting them was legalized starting in 1995.  The doves had an Ohio population of 5 million and were legal prey in 38 states. A pro hunting wildlife group, unsuccessfully challenged the committee's petitions.  The actual wording of the ballot issue, which became "No person shall take or hunt a mourning dove," was contentious.  Some found the issue wording confusing because a "Yes" vote meant support for "No hunting".  Television ads opposing the ballot issue also were hotly contested.  This issue was the only statewide issue on the 1998 ballot.  The ban proposal failed.

Brunner represented pro-gambling interests in an off-track betting ballot issue in Stark County.  After the Canton City Council allowed a new betting parlor, the Stark County Board of Elections deadlocked along party lines on whether to allow a county-wide referendum against off-track betting.  Republican Secretary of State Taft, broke the tie allowing the referendum on September 14.  Brunner appealed the Board's decision to allow the voters the chance to overrule the city council.

In 1998, she represented the Ohio Democratic Party when they challenged 1998 Ohio gubernatorial election candidate Bob Taft's ad campaign. On various occasions, during the race she obtained probable cause determinations by the Ohio Elections Commission that there were improprieties in Taft's television commercials.  While the dispute was being resolved, one of Taft's ads was ordered to be pulled off the air via a restraining order on October 10.  The restraining order was lifted three days later. On October 16, the Ohio Elections Commission rebuked Taft for lying in his commercials.  After the ruling, the candidates continued to contest other campaign ads for a few days.  Then they signed a code of ethics.  During the same election period, she represented Mark L. Mallory in a similar ad campaign battle when he unseated State Senator Janet Howard. In another campaign advertising case, she represented Richard Cordray who charged his opponent, Betty Montgomery with money laundering of campaign advertising funds. Brunner felt Montgomery should have been disqualified in the election.

Brunner also represented a pair of judge candidates who were charged with misconduct during the 1998 elections.  She was able to get charges dismissed against Judge Deborah P. O'Neill of Franklin County Common Pleas Court.  However, a disciplinary panel of the Ohio Supreme Court recommended Stark County Common Pleas judge candidate Elizabeth Burick to pay a $5,000 fine for actions that "demeans the judiciary".

In 1999, she represented a pair of individuals whose published election-related literature was challenged.  She represented Northland Mall owner in his attempts to block funding for roads to the planned Polaris Fashion Place mall.  Her client was able to get a ballot issue placed to oppose the special financing.  Television ad regarding this issue were hotly contested.  The voters failed the proposal before the Franklin County prosecutors decided whether to take actions following the Ohio Election Commission's determination that the ads were false.

In one of her final cases in private practice, Brunner returned to represent interested parties in Bexley.  Although she was campaigning for her own November 2000 election at the time, she represented a restaurant at risk of losing its Sunday liquor license.  After several years of representing controversial parties in elections issues, Brunner, a principal of Brunner, Kirby & Jeffries Co., ran a non-controversial campaign.  Brunner, who was making her first run for elective office, opposed incumbent John F. Bender who had been appointed by Governor Taft in April 2000 to replace the retiring James J. O'Grady.  The race was the only contested race in the general division of Franklin County Common Pleas Court.  During the campaign, Bender outpaced Brunner in fundraising by a $76,613 to $58,145 margin.

Early elective career 
In 2000, Brunner was elected to an unexpired term on the Franklin County Common Pleas Court.  She was reelected in 2002. The Court of Common Pleas judges tested, approved and created a separate drug court to reduce addiction-related recidivism. Judges recommend repeat offenders who have been charged with non-violent felonies stemming from their drug or alcohol addictions for the program, which targets those repeatedly charged with theft, receiving stolen property, writing bad checks, prostitution or drug possession, which are all addiction related crimes. Brunner started the court in April 2004 after several years of research.

In December 2001, she approved a US$22 million settlement between Georgia-Pacific and 6,000 residents that resulted from a 1985 and a 1997 explosion.  The settlement became controversial when several residents remained uncompensated nearly a year later.  She handled cases ranging from a drug-related firebomb death, a former-Columbus Division of Policeman's intramarital shooting and Interstate 71 highway chase, and an Ohio State University student Drive-by shooting death, to an international kidnapping case, alcohol service suspensions, domestic abuse, a sex offender rights case, a federal fugitive case, and a state construction contract case. After Brunner's May 30 ruling in the contract case, which involved the Ohio School Facilities Commission and their $2 billion school construction program, Ohio Governor Bob Taft forced the commission to review its contracts for a five-year retroactive period.  Brunner had ruled that a three-person commission review contracts instead of just the commission's director, Randall Fischer.  Approximately 1,800 contracts were reviewed.  The 10th Ohio District Court of Appeals in Franklin County overturned her ruling.  The Ohio State Supreme Court refused to hear appeals. Despite having been overturned, Brunner was supported by the Ohio Inspector General who found ethics violations.  Brunner was also involved in a controversy for jailing a lawyer who she claimed was in contempt of court that resulted in op-ed page debate.

Brunner resigned from the Court on September 1, 2005, to run for Secretary of State. She ran unopposed in the May 2, 2006 Democratic Primary. On November 7, 2006, she defeated Republican Greg Hartmann in the 2006 general election by a 55%–40% margin and took office on January 8, 2007.  Since the office is one that serves as a keeper of public records, the histories of the two candidates' vigilance against identity theft was an important issue.  The campaign also included mudslinging. She also received significant support from the Secretary of State Project, which "helped me toward the election".

Secretary of State 
Ohio had complaints of voting irregularities in the 2000 and 2004 elections.  The state had hours-long lines at polling places in its major cities in 2004 and a fraud scandal in Cuyahoga County, which includes Cleveland, that led to the convictions of two elections workers on rigging recounts and Ms. Brunner's takeover of the county board of elections. In September 2007, Brunner announced extensive efforts to identify and correct serious problems with the security and reliability of voting machines in time for the March 4, 2008 Ohio Democratic and Republican primaries. In a US$1.9 million federally financed study released December 14, 2007, Brunner reported the results of tests of all five voting systems used in Ohio.  All systems had major flaws.  The study focused on security; reliability of the equipment and the systems; the software configuration; and procedures of the local officials.  Security and procedures were seen to be serious problems.  The security level of the computer equipment did not match the contemporaneous levels of security used in other information-sensitive industries.

She has advocated the replacement of all Ohio voting machines, including the direct-recording electronic (DRE) touch-screen ones used in more than 50 of Ohio's 88 counties. Brunner supports a move to paper ballots, which would use optical scanning.  As a result of the study, during the March 2008 primaries, paper ballots were supposed to be available at all polling places for voters who preferred them.  The paper ballots also served as a backup for machine failures.  Brunner mandated a paper ballot election for the November 2008 general election. This was due both to the study and problems faced during the 2007 election with touch screen electronic voting machines.  However, the Republican-controlled Ohio General Assembly has not addressed the subject of funding an all-paper ballot.  Consequently, Brunner focussed on addressing the procedures instead of the inherent lack of technical security.

In January 2007, Brunner proposed a plan that would allow counties to recruit poll workers by mail, who would then undertake two paid training days, and work a paid eight-hour shift at the polls on Election Day. Brunner explained the plan in an interview:

In terms of Ohio and what happened in the 2004 presidential election, there has been a crisis in confidence in our election system in Ohio, both nationally and in our state. One of the quickest ways to repair that is to make sure that we have adequate numbers of poll workers. ... We suggested this as one tool that the boards of elections would have available to them for recruiting poll workers. We would be looking to do this similar to how we recruit jurors, only jurors are recruited for two weeks of service whereas we'd only be asking for three days. It would also allow us to offer split shifts to poll workers. In Ohio the polling places are open for thirteen hours, so essentially a poll worker works at least fourteen hours; with the average age of our poll workers at 72, that's a tough day for anyone, no matter what their age is. ... It's an option, and we can even include a trigger, so that a county has to be deficient by a certain percentage of poll workers to even be able to use this.

In the initial proposal it was not yet decided what wages would be paid, and whether refusing recruitment would result in penalties. The proposal will be decided by the Ohio General Assembly.

Brunner has established the Voting Right Institute (VRI) to improve voter access to elections in Ohio. The VRI has instituted a "Grads Vote" program which supplies voter registration forms to all graduating high school seniors. The VRI has also partnered with the U.S. Postal Service to include voter registration forms in government moving packets and with the Overseas Vote Foundation to improve online absentee ballot applications for overseas and military voters.

She has also moved to shield social security information and other private information from public view for millions of online records and coordinated with the Ohio General Assembly to prevent the filing of private information.

Brunner worked with Ohio's 88 county boards of elections and thousands of poll workers to ensure record voter turnout in the March presidential primaries.  Despite the record turnout, the primary was marred by paper ballot shortages, bomb threats, ice storms and power failures.  In addition, flooding forced the relocation of some polling places in southeastern Ohio.  21 precincts in the Cleveland metropolitan area were held open for an extra 90 minutes due to paper ballot shortages.  Brunner claimed that in Clermont and Summit Counties ballots ran out because of the number of Republicans who voted in the Democratic primary and that only Democratic ballots ran out.

Brunner has spoken out against election officials taking voting machines home with them in the days before an election.  Such actions could allow hacking even though it makes transport and delivery to the eventual polling place simpler.  Some elections officials say they feel the system is better if elections officials keep an eye on machines the days before the elections.  Brunner says poll workers have sometimes cast ballots on machines in their homes.  She issued the following directive on the matter: "We want Ohio's voters and the rest of the nation to see that we have prepared a transparent process of transporting voting equipment, ballots and supplies. That begins with security practices at boards of elections and polling places, documented chain of custody, and now procedures to make secure voting machine delivery." She has ordered bipartisan transport teams and proscribed storage conditions such as humidity. The federal government will subsidize the cost of her mandate.

2008 general election

Same-day voter registration 

In 2008 Ohio experienced an unintended consequence of a new statute that resulted in a brief period of overlap voting, when absentee voting has started and before the close of voter registration.  This period ran from September 30 until October 6, due to the newly instituted early voting policy. On August 13, 2008, Brunner ordered county election board officials to establish procedures to enable voters who register to be immediately issued an absentee ballot.  Because a voter could show up with only a cell phone bill, give any four digits and claim they were the last four digits of his or her Social Security Number, and then immediately vote and have such ballots put into the same pool as other votes with no procedure for more rigorous scrutiny of their validity, the Republican Party opposed the same day voting plan and fought it in several Ohio Courts. Ohio Republican Party officials and Republican voters argued in separate lawsuits that Ohio law requires voters to be registered for 30 days before they cast an absentee ballot. On September 29, 2008 (a day after lower state and federal courts overruled GOP objections to same-day registration and voting or GOP requests for mandated ballot segregation and verification) the United States Court of Appeals for the Sixth Circuit in Cincinnati, Ohio rejected Republican efforts to stop the plan. United States district court judge James Gwin in Cleveland, Ohio also ruled against the Republicans and issued a restraining order to enforce Brunner's plan. In Columbus, Ohio, U.S. District Judge George Smith declined to rule on another statewide challenge, deferring to the state Supreme Court's decision. The rulings, which opened a window to register and vote on the same day until the absentee ballot deadline on October 6, 2008, was upheld by the Ohio Supreme Court in a 4-3 decision in which two Republican jurists who were on the November 2008 ballot recused themselves and were replaced by one Republican and one Democrat by Chief Justice Thomas Moyer.  The normal roster of Ohio Supreme Court jurists is all Republican and the lone Democrat replacement, William H. Wolff Jr., cast the tie-breaking vote.  The dissenters noted that Ohio's Constitution requires that a person register to vote 30 days in before voting. Brunner ordered segregation of same-day-registration ballots and verification of them before counting them on Election Day, November 4, 2008.  In related proceedings on September 30, 2008, Judge Smith of The U.S. District Court for the Southern District of Ohio in Columbus had granted an Ohio Republican Party request for a restraining order that would mandate election observers during early voting.  Brunner prevailed in the appellate court which ruled that the district court "abused its discretion" in granting the restraining order.

The same-day registration ballots are subject to the standard Ohio notification card protocol whereby a postcard is sent to the newly registered address to assist in determining the validity of the address. A card that comes back marked return to sender is questioned and marked on the voter rolls.  Additionally, the boards of elections submit new voter registrations into a database in the office of the Ohio Secretary of State.  The information is matched with driver's licenses on an Ohio Bureau of Motor Vehicles database and failing a match there it is sent to the Social Security Administration to pursue a match.

Help America Vote Act (HAVA) 
Ohio (along with Colorado, Indiana, Michigan, Nevada and North Carolina) is one of six states expected to be heavily affected by compliance with the 2002 Help America Vote Act, which mandates that states corroborate voter registration applications with government databases.  Due to the disproportionate voter registration by Democrats it is anticipated that much of the confusion at the polling places will be for challenges to newly registered Democrats who have been delisted from the ranks of registered voters.

It appears that Ohio is using social security information to verify new voter registration, even though "[u]nder federal law, election officials are supposed to use the Social Security database to check a registration application only as a last resort, if no record of the applicant is found [within the state's own] databases," according to a New York Times article. Michael J. Astrue, commissioner of the Social Security Administration, alerted the United States Department of Justice and sent letters to six states including Ohio to ensure compliance with federal law.  Brunner has stated that the filing of paperwork by Republican officials may be an attempt to establish grounds for contesting ballots on Election Day.  The paperwork requires use of provisional ballots by persons with discrepant registrations.  On October 9, 2008, the Republicans also were granted an order against Brunner by Judge Smith requiring that Brunner must perform voter registration verification according to the Help America Vote Act.  Matching new registrants' information against Ohio Bureau of Motor Vehicles or the Social Security Administration databases is one of the requirements. Challenges to mismatched registrations, which force the use of provisional ballots, must be filed twenty days prior to the election. Legal expert Greta Van Susteren viewed the ruling as a significant breaking news story and interviewed Brunner on her show On the Record w/ Greta Van Susteren the day it was made. Van Susteren interpreted the ruling as a statement that Brunner has not been taking sufficient steps to prevent voter fraud.  Democracy Now! also interviewed Brunner on that day, but they did so before the final verdict.

Between January 1, 2008, and mid-October 2008, over 666,000 Ohioans registered to vote either for the first time or with updated voter information, and over 200,000 of them provided driver's licenses or Social Security numbers that do not match government records.  Over 20% of these voters are from Cuyahoga County, which is heavily Democratic.  Also, many of the newly registered voters were the result of voter registration drives to register voters for Barack Obama and Hillary Clinton for the March 4, 2008 Ohio Democratic primary. The United States Court of Appeals for the Sixth Circuit, in a 9-6 decision, ruled against Brunner on October 14, 2008, in deciding that extra steps must be taken to authenticate these registrants and Jeffrey Sutton's majority opinion suggested that these misregistered voters cast provisional ballots.  Historically, 20% of provisional ballots have been thrown out.  As a result of the ruling, Brunner's Office of the Ohio Secretary of State must provide each county with a list of registrants with mismatching information and provide direction on a proper course of action.  There are federal laws barring purging voters from the election rolls within 90 days of an election.  This issue is considered to be a partisan one with Republicans favoring greater scrutiny, and the justices voted almost along party lines based on the United States President that appointed them.

On October 17, 2008, in Brunner v. Ohio Republican Party, 07A332, the United States Supreme Court overturned the 6th Circuit Decision requiring Brunner to provide lists of improperly registered voters to each county election board.  The ruling means that Brunner can instruct the 88 county boards of elections to ignore public record requests by the Ohio Republican Party made to challenge registrants with information mismatched between their registration and their driver's license or social security number.  The Republican Party claimed that the ruling was based on a technicality rather than the merits of the arguments.  Bennett said that "The justices did not disagree with our argument that Jennifer Brunner has failed to comply with federal election law.  They merely said we don't have a right to bring a private challenge against her under this particular provision."  The McCain-Palin campaign said "...the United States Supreme Court does not address violations of the Help America Vote Act (HAVA) by Ohio Secretary of State Jennifer Brunner. Rather, the Court ruled that Congress had likely not authorized private individuals or political parties to bring suit under the section of HAVA requiring voter registration verification through data-matching."  Since the ruling did not directly address the issues that the Republicans wanted determined, they filed a similar case in the Ohio Supreme Court.  However, they withdrew the case.

Other issues 
One month before the 2008 United States election, 5% of Ohio mortgages were either severely delinquent or in foreclosure. There were 67,658 foreclosure actions in the first half of 2008. An editorial in The New York Times purported that Republicans may try to use foreclosure lists to block voters. Brunner warned all election boards that involvement in a foreclosure is not, by itself, sufficient basis for challenging enfranchisement.

On entering office, Brunner took immediate action against Republican county elections officials, including Robert T. Bennett, Ohio Republican Party Chairman. At the time, while writing for The Cincinnati Enquirer, columnist Peter Bronson described Brunner as "the most partisan state official in Ohio". More recently, she has been accused of partisanship by her former Secretary of State opponent in the 2008 general election.  He claims that she set policy in order to throw out absentee ballots likely to be cast for the John McCain-Sarah Palin ticket.  The Ohio State Supreme Court supported the Republican argument.  Other sources claim that ACORN advises and influences Brunner.

The 2008 general election was expected to be marred by Diebold electronic voting machines that had malfunctioned on vote transfers from the local precinct machines to the county election board headquarters.  Brunner is suing Diebold for other types of vote-dropping malfunctions.  Fifty-three of eighty-eight counties used the problematic touch screen electronic voting machines.  The machines had also mysteriously crashed and their printers had jammed in the 2007 elections.  Brunner feels that electronic machines should be avoided until they achieve the same security standards as the computer equipment in the banking and communications industries.  She issued a report that both Premier Election Solutions (a Diebold subsidiary) and Hart and Election Systems & Software produce electronic voting systems with severe security flaws.

Brunner has made several specific efforts to alleviate some of the past voting difficulties. 2008 was the first Ohio election that permits absentee voting as a matter of preference without any justification for need.  This resulted in a record number of absentee ballots.  Additionally, voting machine redistribution has been closely studied with the hope of alleviating long waits in problem areas.  Redistribution is based on past turnout, new registrations, any recent purges under the National Voter Registration Act, and the number of ballot issues in the district.  Each precinct has been supplied with sufficient paper ballots to accommodate 25% number of voters who voted in the previous presidential election.

Brunner has noted that only incarcerated convicted felons become ineligible to vote in Ohio.  Thus, persons incarcerated for misdemeanors and persons detained in prisons awaiting new trials can vote directly from prison.

In fall of 2008, Brunner was challenged in a pair of cases involving the Northeast Ohio Coalition for the Homeless.  In September, in Project Vote (on behalf of Northeast Ohio Coalition for the Homeless) v. Madison County Board of Elections, No. 1:08-cv-02266 (N.D. Ohio), Judge Garvin enjoined the Madison County Board of
Elections from adhering to its September 5 announcement that it would disregard Secretary Brunner's directives to issue an absentee ballot to anyone who has not already been registered for 30 days. The Board had threatened an action that the judge determined would violate Section 202 of the Voting Rights Act causing irreparable injury to
registered voters who will be unable to receive absentee ballots. On October 27, 2008, in the case The Northeast Ohio Coalition for the Homeless v. Brunner, Case No. C206-
896, U.S. District Judge Edmund Sargus ruled that in concert with Ohio Revised Code § 3503.02(I) which states: "If a person does not have a fixed place of habitation, but has a shelter or other location at which the person has been a consistent or regular inhabitant and to which the person has the intention of returning, that shelter or other location shall be deemed the person's residence for the purpose of registering to vote."  The order mandated that Brunner as Secretary of State "instruct the County Boards of Elections that provisional ballots may not be rejected for failing to list a building address on the provisional ballot envelope if the voter resides at a location that does not have an address."  This ruling states that all Ohio counties must allow homeless voters use non-building locations such as park benches as their addresses.  At the same time, the court ruled that poll worker error is not a valid reason to reject a provisional ballot.  Time said that these rulings brought uniformity in handling provisional ballots to the counties that did not previously exist.

On October 20, 2008, Brunner had to temporarily shut down the Ohio Secretary of State website after it was hacked.  The offense was placed under the jurisdiction of the Ohio State Highway Patrol.  At the time of the announcement Ohio Governor Ted Strickland noted that Brunner has been the subject of threats and Brunner noted that her office has been assaulted with threats and actual delivery of abuse.

In November 2008, Brunner became involved in a legal battle against two Steve Stivers supporters that relates to the validity of a 1000 provisional ballots in the race for Ohio's 15th congressional district that at the time of recounting had a 149-vote margin and 27,000 absentee ballots to be counted.  The case was consolidated with other cases in the United States District Court upon Brunner's request. On December 5, 2008, Stivers' supporters won a ruling in the Ohio Supreme Court that the 1,000 provisional ballots that lacked signatures or had names and signatures in the wrong places be thrown out.

2010 campaign for U.S. Senate 

Brunner's term as Ohio Secretary of State ended in 2011 and she was up for re-election in 2010 along with other Ohio statewide offices. In January, rumors that were eventually confirmed began circulating that second term Republican United States Senator George Voinovich would not run for re-election in 2010. Brunner's name was mentioned as a potential Democratic candidate for the seat. On January 23, 2009, Brunner and Ohio Lieutenant Governor Lee Fisher met to discuss the possibility that either of them would run, but did not confirm any decision or leanings to the media.

On February 17, 2009, Brunner announced that she would be a candidate for the U.S. Senate in 2010. She ran against Fisher for the Democratic nomination. In September 2009, DSCC Chairman Bob Menendez, who supported Fisher and had been trying to clear the field for him, stated he would actively work against any underfunded candidate, in which Brunner eventually responded "I'm not scared of you" at a fundraiser in Washington D.C. in December of that year. By February 2010, she had significantly less cash on hand than Fisher or likely general election opponent Rob Portman (who would eventually win the seat), but claimed, "I only need enough money to win," adding, "And frankly, in this economic environment, it's rather obscene when people start crowing about how many millions they have on hand." Polling in late 2009 and January 2010 showed Brunner to be more competitive than Fisher in a general election matchup against Portman, while Fisher and Brunner were deadlocked in Democratic primary polling. Her budget-spirited campaign employed "Rosie the Riveter" imagery and the use of an old school bus called "The Courage Express" to travel across the state. During the campaign Fisher faced accusations of being afraid of Fox News and being too staged and not genuine. The final Quinnipiac Poll released at the end of April showed Brunner leading Fisher among men 38-24% and defeating Portman 40-36%.

Brunner lost to Fisher in the May 4, 2010 party primary, 55% to 45%.

2014 campaign for Ohio Tenth District Court of Appeals 
Brunner was certified as the sole Democratic candidate running for the Ohio Tenth District Court of Appeals seat occupied by incumbent judge Amy O'Grady, who was appointed to the seat by Governor John Kasich in 2013. The 2014 judicial elections are notable for the number of judges on the ballot, with The Columbus Dispatch stating that it was the first time 12 contested judicial seats would appear on the ballot in Franklin County, Ohio.  She was the only Democratic nominee for the appellate seat, running against incumbent judge Amy O'Grady. Brunner defeated O'Grady and was elected to a two-year term as Franklin County appeals judge unexpired term in the General Election.

2020 campaign for Ohio Supreme Court 

In August 2019, Brunner announced her candidacy to be a justice of the Supreme Court of Ohio, challenging incumbent Judith L. French. On November 3, 2020, she went on to win the general election with 55% of the vote.

2022 Campaign for Chief Justice of the Ohio Supreme Court 
On June 8, 2021, Brunner announced her candidacy for Chief Justice of the Ohio Supreme Court in the November 8, 2022, general election. In a virtual news conference on September 13, 2021, Brunner released a campaign platform that includes support for a statewide criminal sentencing database, a proposal for a permanent Commission on Fairness and Equality in Ohio’s Courts and Legal System, expansion of specialized dockets like drug courts, and what the Cleveland Plain Dealer called "good-government reforms."

International work 
Brunner worked with the United States Agency for International Development (USAID) of the US Department of State as a consultant on campaign finance, elections, and ballot issues in the Republic of Serbia during 2012.  Brunner also served as an adviser to Serbian misdemeanor court judges on outreach strategies to rebuild the public's confidence in elections systems. The project, named Judicial Reform and Government Accountability, also aims to enable the Serbian government to better detect and prevent corruption in the government. She has been engaged to serve as an adviser through USAID four times, with a trip to Serbia in 2013 assisting the Serbian Minister of Justice with judicial reform.

Brunner also served as an international election observer in Egypt for the 2014 Egyptian constitutional referendum.

Judge Brunner is a Member of the Board of Advisors of the Berlin, Prague and Sydney-based Global Panel Foundation - a respected NGO which works behind-the-scenes in conflict areas around the world.

Personal 
Brunner is a resident of Columbus, Ohio.  She and her husband, Rick, have been married since 1978 and have three adult children.  They have also been foster parents to three children.  Brunner is an alumna of Whetstone High School in Clintonville, Ohio. Brunner served on the Ohio Student Loan Commission, a nine-member group that guarantees loans for college students, for a term that ended in 1992. Republican Governor John Kasich appointed her to a Democratic seat the Ohio Cultural Facilities Commission in 2011, which was legislated out of existence in 2013. In October 2012, Kasich also appointed her to the Ohio Counselor, Social Worker, Marriage and Family Therapist Board. Columbus Mayor Michael B. Coleman appointed Brunner to the Central Ohio Transit Authority Board in 2013.

In March 2008, Brunner was given the Profile in Courage Award by the John F. Kennedy Presidential Library and Museum.  She earned the award for challenging the reliability of electronic voting in order to protect the right to vote in Ohio.  The award was announced on March 18, 2008.  She received the award May 12, 2008.  Brunner assumed office in 2007 and ordered paper ballots be provided to any voter who requested one in the March 2008 primary and called for the replacement of all the state's electronic voting systems by the November 2008 presidential election.  Her overhaul of the Ohio voting system was considered costly and reckless by some, but after the election her risk was heralded in the press as successful.

General election results

Notes

External links 

 Ohio Secretary of State official Ohio government site
 Brunner for Judge official campaign site
 
 
 2010 campaign contributions at OpenSecrets.org
Brunner on the Foreclosure Crisis and Her State’s Lawsuit Against Ally Financial – video interview by Democracy Now!
 [http://www.dispatchpolitics.com/live/content/local_news/stories/2010/08/15/copy/local-ballot-issues-often-clear-as-mud.html?sid=101/ Columbus Dispatch Local ballot issues often clear as mud]

|-

1957 births
20th-century American lawyers
21st-century American judges
21st-century American politicians
20th-century American women lawyers
21st-century American women politicians
Capital University Law School alumni
Judges of the Ohio District Courts of Appeals
Justices of the Ohio Supreme Court
Lawyers from Columbus, Ohio
Living people
Miami University alumni
Ohio Democrats
Politicians from Columbus, Ohio
Secretaries of State of Ohio
Whetstone High School (Columbus, Ohio) alumni
Women in Ohio politics
21st-century American women judges